Bouvet ASA is a Norwegian IT consulting company, headquartered in Oslo, Norway.

The company is the result of a merger between Mandator AS and Cell Network AS in 2001 with Cell Network as the acquiring company.
The company changed its name to Bouvet in 2007.

References

Information technology consulting firms of Norway
Consulting firms established in 1995
Companies based in Oslo
Companies listed on the Oslo Stock Exchange